Stand Up.BG! We are coming! (IBG-NI), until 20 July 2021 known as Stand up! Mafia, Get Out! (ISMV) was a coalition of political parties in Bulgaria established by leaders of Stand Up.BG and The Poisonous Trio (Otrovnoto trio), also including Movement 21 (D21), the Bulgaria for Citizens Movement (DBG), the United People's Party and the Agrarian People's Union (ZNS)

Name 
The second part of the former name of the party, "Mafia, get out!" (мутра, pl. мутри being a slang word for mafia member), was taken directly from president Rumen Radev's final words in his speech in 9 July 2020 in front of the gathered crowd which was one of the factors that sparked the 2020–2021 anti-government protests. In his speech, Radev called for the expulsion of the Bulgarian mafia from the executive and the judiciary.

On 20 July 2021, the party changed its name to "Stand Up.BG! We are coming!"

Election results

Notes

References

See also
The Left (Bulgaria)

2020 establishments in Bulgaria
Anti-corruption parties
Defunct political party alliances in Bulgaria
Direct democracy parties
Political parties established in 2021
Populist parties
Pro-European political parties in Bulgaria